William James Morgan (October 16, 1840 – September 5, 1900) was an American newspaper editor and politician.

Early life
Morgan was born on October 16, 1840 in Peterborough, Ontario, Upper Canada.

He came to the United States when 10 years old, and attended the public schools in Buffalo, New York.

Career
At the outbreak of the American Civil War, he enlisted as a private in the 116th New York Volunteer Infantry, and fought in the Siege of Port Hudson and Battle of Cedar Creek. He was several times wounded, and retired in 1864 as a brevet lieutenant colonel of volunteers. Upon his return to Buffalo, he joined the editorial staff of The Buffalo Commercial newspaper in 1869, where he worked for the next 20 years.

Political career
In 1880, Governor Alonzo B. Cornell appointed him a canal appraiser, and he served as Chairman of the Canal Board. President Benjamin Harrison appointed him Collector of Customs at the Port of Buffalo in 1889, serving until 1893.

In 1894, he was appointed Deputy Comptroller by James A. Roberts, and in 1898 was elected New York State Comptroller to succeed Roberts. He died on the day of his re-nomination by the Republican state convention.

Personal life
In 1869, Morgan married Mary Catherine Reese (1843–1909), a daughter of George Reese and Susannah ( Brower) Reese. Together, they were the parents of three daughters and two sons, including:

 Mabel Morgan (1870–1941), who married Courtland C. Briggs in 1893.
 Morgan, who married William A. Kendall.
 Percy R. Morgan (1878–1961), a lawyer and town supervisor.
 J. Warren Morgan (b. 1880), a civil engineer.
 Mai Morgan, who married attorney Richard H. Templeton in 1908.

Morgan died of heart disease on September 5, 1900 at 1 Main Avenue, his home in Albany, New York. His home in Buffalo was 407 Norwood Avenue. Services in Buffalo were held at the Richmond Avenue Methodist-Episcopal Church with the pall bearers as Secretary of State John T. McDonough, State Engineer Edward A. Bond, Attorney General John C. Davies, State Treasurer John P. Jaeckel, Superintendent of Public Works John Nelson Partridge, Speaker of the Assembly S. Frederick Nixon, Deputy Controller Theodore P. Gilman, Thomas Austin, and Judge D. S. Potter of Glens Falls. His wife died in 1909 at the home of their daughter Mai.

References

1840 births
1900 deaths
Pre-Confederation Canadian emigrants to the United States
New York State Comptrollers
Politicians from Buffalo, New York
New York (state) Republicans
American male journalists
Journalists from New York (state)
19th-century American male writers
19th-century American politicians
19th-century American newspaper editors
Collectors of the Port of Buffalo